Ronnie Lee (born December 24, 1956) is a former American football offensive tackle who played 14 seasons in the National Football League, 10 seasons for the Miami Dolphins. He started his career as a tight end.

1956 births
Living people
Sportspeople from Pine Bluff, Arkansas
American football offensive tackles
American football offensive guards
American football tight ends
Baylor Bears football players
Miami Dolphins players
Atlanta Falcons players
Seattle Seahawks players